Garrincha: Hero of the Jungle is a 1962 Brazilian documentary film directed by Joaquim Pedro de Andrade, about the Brazilian soccer player Garrincha. It was entered into the 13th Berlin International Film Festival. In 2006, the documentary was selected as part of a special section of the 63rd Venice International Film Festival, dedicated to Joaquim Pedro de Andrade.

Cast
 Garrincha as himself
 Heron Domingues as himself

References

External links

1962 documentary films
1962 films
1960s Portuguese-language films
1960s biographical films
Brazilian black-and-white films
Brazilian biographical films
Brazilian association football films
Brazilian documentary films
Documentary films about association football
Documentary films about sportspeople
Films directed by Joaquim Pedro de Andrade